İlyaslı is a belde (town) in the central district (Uşak) of Uşak Province, Turkey. Situated at  it is in the interior subregion  of the Aegean Region. The population of the town  was 1963  as of 2011. The settlement was probably founded in the 17th century by a certain Yörük (nomadic Turkmen) named İlyas. It is a typical Anatolian agricultural town, the main product being cereals. There is also a ceramic mine around the town. Another town revenue is from İlyaslı residents working  in Germany as gastarbeiter.

References

Populated places in Uşak Province
Towns in Turkey
Uşak Central District